Alessandro Dettori (born December 26, 1989) is an Italian professional football player currently playing for Lega Pro Seconda Divisione team S.S. Villacidrese Calcio on loan from Cagliari Calcio.

External links
 

1989 births
Living people
Italian footballers
Association football midfielders
S.S. Villacidrese Calcio players